Alexey Leonidovich Toropchenko (born 25 June 1999) is a Russian professional ice hockey forward for the  St. Louis Blues in the National Hockey League (NHL). He was drafted 113th overall by the Blues in the fourth round of the 2017 NHL Entry Draft.

Playing career

Junior 
Toropchenko was an alternate captain for the HK MVD Balashikha in the Junior Hockey League (MHL) before being drafted fourth overall by the Guelph Storm for the Ontario Hockey League (OHL) in the 2017 CHL Import Draft.

In his OHL debut on 22 September 2017, Toropchenko made his first OHL goal and assist in a 4–3 shootout loss against the Sarnia Sting. Overall, he played 66 games with 17 goals and 22 assists in the 2017–18 OHL season. In his sophomore season, he played 62 games with 17 goals and 26 assists, helping the Storm win their fourth J. Ross Robertson Cup in the 2019 OHL playoffs.

Professional 

After being drafted 113rd overall by the St. Louis Blues in the fourth round of the 2017 NHL Entry Draft, the Blues signed Toropchenko to a three-year entry-level contract on 13 December 2018.

On 13 April 2018, Toropchenko made his professional debut with the Blues' then AHL affiliate, the San Antonio Rampage, in a 4–2 loss against the Texas Stars. On 1 November 2019, he made his first professional goal in a 4–2 win against the Stars, ultimately playing 59 games with five goals and four assists in the 2019–20 AHL season.

On 29 September 2020, the Blues assigned Toropchenko to the HC Kunlun Red Star of the Kontinental Hockey League (KHL) for the 2020–21 KHL season, ultimately playing 45 games with seven goals and four assists. He made his KHL debut on 4 October 2020 in a 6–3 loss against Dynamo Moscow. He scored his first KHL goal on 19 October 2020 in a 3–1 win against Torpedo Nizhny Novgorod. On 25 October 2020 in a game against CSKA Moscow, he scored the fastest goal in Kunlun Red Star history, scoring 34 seconds into the first period.

He returned to the Blues' AHL affiliate, the Springfield Thunderbirds, for the 2021–22 season.

On 14 December 2021, after the Blues suffered a COVID-19 outbreak, Toropchenko made his NHL debut in a 4–1 win against the Dallas Stars.

International play 

Toropchenko represented Russia men's national under-18 ice hockey team at the 2016 Ivan Hlinka Memorial Tournament and the 2017 IIHF World U18 Championships, winning a bronze medal in both tournaments.

Personal life 

His father, Leonid, was the 260th overall pick for the Pittsburgh Penguins in the 1993 NHL Entry Draft and played 14 seasons of professional hockey in Russia and North America. He died of a heart attack in May 2017.

Career statistics

Regular season and playoffs

International

References

External links 

 

1999 births
Living people
Guelph Storm players
HC Kunlun Red Star players
Ice hockey people from Moscow
Russian ice hockey right wingers
San Antonio Rampage players
Springfield Thunderbirds players
St. Louis Blues draft picks
St. Louis Blues players